Yang Yong-ok (born 4 February 1935) is a South Korean cross-country skier. He competed in the men's 30 kilometre event at the 1964 Winter Olympics.

References

1935 births
Living people
South Korean male cross-country skiers
Olympic cross-country skiers of South Korea
Cross-country skiers at the 1964 Winter Olympics
Sportspeople from Seoul
20th-century South Korean people